Vadzim Yerchyk (born 14 July 1991) is a retired Belarusian professional football player.

Honours
Dacia Chişinău
Moldovan National Division champion: 2010–11

External links
 

1991 births
Living people
Belarusian footballers
FC Torpedo-BelAZ Zhodino players
FC Dacia Chișinău players
FC Sfîntul Gheorghe players
Belarusian expatriate footballers
Expatriate footballers in Moldova
Association football forwards